Comrade X is a 1940 American comedy spy film directed by King Vidor and starring Clark Gable and Hedy Lamarr. The supporting cast features Oskar Homolka, Eve Arden and Sig Rumann. In February 2020, the film was shown at the 70th Berlin International Film Festival, as part of a retrospective dedicated to King Vidor's career.

Plot
In the Soviet Union, American reporter McKinley "Mac" Thompson (Clark Gable) secretly writes unflattering stories about the Soviet Union, attributed to "Comrade X", for his newspaper. His identity is discovered by his valet, Vanya (Felix Bressart), who blackmails Mac into promising to get his daughter, a streetcar conductor named Theodore (Hedy Lamarr), out of the country. Theodore agrees to a sham marriage so she can spread the message of the benefits of Communism to the rest of the world. However, Commissar Vasiliev (Oscar Homolka) is determined to unmask and arrest Comrade X. Eventually Theodore sees the "wicked hypocrisy of Communism" and falls in love with Thompson.

Cast
 Clark Gable as McKinley B. "Mac" Thompson
 Hedy Lamarr as Golubka / Theodore Yahupitz / Lizvanetchka "Lizzie"
 Oskar Homolka as Commissar Vasiliev
 Felix Bressart as Igor Yahupitz / Vanya
 Eve Arden as Jane Wilson
 Sig Rumann as Emil Von Hofer 
 Natasha Lytess as Olga Milanava
 Vladimir Sokoloff as Michael Bastakoff
 Edgar Barrier as Rubick, Commissar's Aide
 Georges Renavent as Laszlo, world press attendee (credited as George Renevant)
 Mikhail Rasumny as arresting Russian Officer

Production
 Production on Comrade X began filming in late August 1940.
 The film was nominated for an Academy Award for Best Story.

Gable prophetically jokes that "Germany just invaded Russia" and "Panzer tanks are rolling into Ukraine" to get the Russian hotel manager to kick the German reporter out of his room.  Less than a year after release, Germany did indeed invade Russia and the Ukrainian SSR.

Pre-war American films such as Comrade X and Ninotchka also depict the Soviet Union as backwards, dreary, depressing and totalitarian.  After the United States entered the war on Russia's side, however, Hollywood's depictions of Russians immediately changed to brave, honorable, freedom-loving liberators. The UK specifically pulled Comrade X from the cinemas.

At one point in the movie, after McKinley feeds vodka to his secretary Olga and embraces her, Golubka enters his room and the women engage in a "hair pulling battle" for  his affections that Variety described as “a honey."

Box office
According to MGM records the film earned $1,520,000 in the US and Canada and $559,000 elsewhere resulting in a profit of $484,000.

References

External links

1940 films
1940 romantic comedy films
1940s screwball comedy films
American romantic comedy films
American screwball comedy films
American black-and-white films
1940s English-language films
Films about journalists
Films directed by King Vidor
Films scored by Bronisław Kaper
Films set in Russia
Films set in Moscow
Films set in Romania
Metro-Goldwyn-Mayer films
Films with screenplays by Ben Hecht
Films with screenplays by Charles Lederer
1940s American films